Albanian Supercup 2003 is the tenth edition of the Albanian Supercup since its establishment in 1989. The match was contested between the Albanian Cup 2003 winners Dinamo Tirana and the 2002–03 Albanian Superliga champions KF Tirana.

Match details

See also
 2002–03 Albanian Superliga
 2002–03 Albanian Cup

References

RSSSF.com

2003
Supercup
Albanian Supercup, 2003
Albanian Supercup, 2003